Grabik  is a village in the administrative district of Gmina Żary, within Żary County, Lubusz Voivodeship, in western Poland.

In village play local football team Sparta Grabik which is currently playing at Klasa A level. The highest level at which team had played was IV liga in 2009-12 years.

References

Grabik